The Synagogue of the New Jewish Congregation (often known by its acronym NCI) is a synagogue in Montevideo, Uruguay.

Overview
The New Jewish Congregation was founded in 1936 mostly by German and Austrian Jews who fled Nazism. It established two synagogues, the big one on Wilson Ferreira Aldunate Street is Conservative, the smaller one was Orthodox.

In the 21st century, a new Temple was established in the neighbourhood of Pocitos, at Cipriano Payán street.

See also

 List of synagogues in Uruguay

References

External links
  

Austrian-Jewish diaspora
Conservative Judaism in South America
German immigration to Uruguay
German-Jewish diaspora
Synagogues in Montevideo
Conservative synagogues
Centro, Montevideo
Pocitos, Montevideo